Nativity of Our Lord High School, commonly called Nativity High School, was established in Detroit, Michigan, USA in 1914. The Dominican Sisters from Racine, Wisconsin, and one lay person taught at the school.

References

High schools in Detroit
Defunct Catholic secondary schools in Michigan
1914 establishments in Michigan
1971 disestablishments in Michigan